Nomadland may refer to:

 Nomadland (book), a 2017 non-fiction book by Jessica Bruder
 Nomadland (film), a 2020 drama film based on the book